Elcio Martín Correa Rodríguez (born 4 June 2000) is a Uruguayan professional footballer who plays as a goalkeeper.

Career

Peñarol
Correa joined the Peñarol first team in January 2020 after a six year spell in the club's youth system. He made his debut for the club in February of that year in a 2-1 victory over Cerro.

Career statistics

Club

References

External links

Martín Correa at the Peñarol Official Website

2000 births
Living people
Peñarol players
Uruguayan Primera División players
Uruguayan footballers
Association football goalkeepers
People from Rivera Department